In chess, a blunder is a critically bad move or other poor decision, severely worsening the player's position by allowing a loss of material, checkmate, or anything similar. It is usually caused by some tactical oversight, whether it be from time trouble, overconfidence or carelessness. Although blunders are most common in amateur games, all human players make them, even at the world championship level. Creating opportunities for the opponent to blunder is an important skill in  chess.

What qualifies as a "blunder" rather than a normal mistake is somewhat subjective. A weak move from a novice player might be explained by the player's lack of skill, while the same move from a master might be called a blunder. In chess annotation, blunders are typically marked with a double question mark, "", after the move.

Especially among amateur and novice players, blunders often occur because of a faulty thought process where players do not consider the opponent's . In particular, checks, and  need to be considered at each move. Neglecting these possibilities leaves a player vulnerable to simple tactical errors.

This practice was not uncommon even at the grandmaster level. However, in 2005 the International Chess Federation (FIDE) banned it, instead requiring that the move be made before being written down. The US Chess Federation also implemented this rule, effective as of January 1, 2007 (a change to rule 15A), although it is not universally enforced.

Examples
Strong players, even grandmasters, occasionally make critical blunders.

Mikhail Chigorin vs. Wilhelm Steinitz

This position is from game 23 of the 1892 World Championship in Havana, Cuba. Chigorin, playing White, is a piece up (Steinitz lost a knight for a pawn earlier in the game), but his bishop is forced to stay on d6 to protect both the rook on e7 and the pawn on h2. If he won, Chigorin would have tied the match and sent it to a tiebreaker game. After 31...Rcd2, he played 32.Bb4. Steinitz replied 32...Rxh2+ and Chigorin immediately  (in light of the blind swine mate 33.Kg1 Rdg2#), losing the match.

Ernst Gruenfeld vs. Alexander Alekhine

This game between Ernst Gruenfeld and Alexander Alekhine is from Karlsbad tournament in 1923, round 2. In position on the diagram, White is to make his 30th move. Gruenfeld played 30.f3?? which immediately loses to 30...Rxd4 because 31.exd4 is impossible: after 31...Bxd4+ 32.Kf1 Nf4 33.Qxe4 Qc4+ 35.Ke1 Nxg2+ 36.Kd2 Be3+ and White will at least lose his queen.  The game ended shortly afterwards following some further blunders by  Gruenfeld: 31.fxe4 Nxf4 32.exf4 Qc4 33.Qxc4?? Rxd1+ 34.Qf1?? Bd4+ and he resigned due to the unavoidable back-rank mate 35.Kh1 Rxf1#.

Archil Ebralidze vs. Viacheslav Ragozin 

This chess game was played at the USSR Chess Championship in 1937, held in Tbilisi. 

Ragozin was planning to trade rooks with 40...Rc7 41.Rxc7 Bd6+ as this would transpose the game into a winning bishop versus knight endgame for Black. Therefore, Ragozin played 40...Rc7??, not realizing that after 41.Rxc7, the bishop would be pinned to the king, and would therefore be a full blunder of a rook.

Ebralidze started to calculate, not wanting to be in a lost endgame. He, too, had not realized that after 41.Rxc7 the bishop would be pinned. After Ebralidze had thought for around 15 minutes, according to Adrian Mikhalchishin, "the crowd went literally crazy." 

Someone in the audience shouted "Archil, take the rook!" Further shouts from the audience followed. Eventually, Ebralidze shouted back "I can see that, you patzers!". Ebralidze played 41.Rd5??, missing the free rook entirely.

The game continued 41...Bf6 42.Nb5 Rc2+ 43.Kg3 a6 44.Rd7+ Ke8 45.Rc7??, with Ebralidze losing his rook to the bishop fork 45...Be5+, which Ragozin played, and Ebralidze resigned.

Tigran Petrosian vs. David Bronstein

This position arose in the 1956 Candidates Tournament in Amsterdam. Petrosian (White), enjoys a clear advantage with strong knights, active rooks and great mobility while Black's position is congested. Bronstein (Black) has for the last seven turns made aimless knight moves, Nc6–d4–c6–d4, and now has played ...Nd4–f5, threatening White's queen while White had kept strengthening his position. White can preserve the advantage by a move like 36.Qc7.

Miguel Najdorf vs. Bobby Fischer

This game between Miguel Najdorf and Bobby Fischer from the 1966 Piatigorsky Cup is an example where a player in a bad position breaks under the pressure. According to Mednis, Fischer's decisive error came earlier in the game, and here the black pawn on f4 is about to fall. Fischer played the blunder 30...Nd6?? cutting the game short.

Najdorf commented on Black's 29...Rb8: "There is no satisfactory defense. If 29...Ba8 then 30.Nb6 or 30.Qf5 would win. ... I had to win minor  (the pawn at f4) but this [30...Nd6] decides immediately. Fischer, demoralized because of his inferior position, did not notice the simple point."

Viktor Korchnoi vs. Anatoly Karpov

This position is from Game 17 of the 1978 World Championship between Viktor Korchnoi, the challenger, and the World Champion, Anatoly Karpov. Karpov, playing Black, is threatening a back-rank mate with 39...Rc1#. Korchnoi could have prevented this by moving his g-pawn (but not the h-pawn because 39.h3 or h4 leads to 39...Rc1+ 40.Kh2 Nf1+ 41.Kg1 Nfg3+ 42.Kh2 Rh1#), providing an escape square for his king. In serious time trouble, Korchnoi played  and resigned after 39...Nf3+ with the forced checkmate after 40.gxf3 Rg6+ 41.Kh1 Nf2# or 40.Kh1 Nf2#. Karpov went on to win the match and later beat Korchnoi again in 1981 in the "Massacre in Merano".

Abraham Sztern vs. Rolf Lundquist

In this position, Black offered a draw. White asked Black to make a move first. According to the rules of chess (see draw by agreement), Black must make a move in response to this request, and the draw offer cannot be retracted. Black played 28...Qxb2+!, which wins on the spot (29.Kxb2 Rb3+ 30.Ka1 Ra8+ 31.Ba6 Rxa6#). White was so stunned he forgot he could still accept the draw offer, and resigned.

This blunder was published in a one-off Not the British Chess Magazine organized by GM Murray Chandler in 1984, where it was voted the blunder of the year by a team of panelists.

Murray Chandler vs. Susan Polgar

In this example, from a tournament in Biel in 1987, the game did not result in a loss for the blunderer, but led to an embarrassing draw for the British GM Murray Chandler. In the diagram position, Chandler is completely winning. His opponent, Susan Polgar, played the wily trap 53...Ng8–h6. However, since the bishop is unable to control the promotion square h8, Black will draw if she is able to get her king to control h8 due to the wrong rook pawn fortress. But Chandler calculates further, and realizes that it is he who will win control over the h8 square after 55.Kf6, and thereby win the game.

Therefore, Chandler played 54.gxh6+??, but instead of the expected 54...Kxh6, Polgar played 54...Kh8, leading to almost the same king, bishop, and rook pawn versus bare king situation as Chandler had calculated that he would avoid, and the small difference that White has two rook pawns rather than one has no effect on the result. Black controls the h8 square and cannot be chased or squeezed away from it, and so White cannot promote his pawn. After 55.Bd5 Kh7 56.Kf7 Kh8 the players agreed to a draw.

Chandler had numerous moves that would have maintained his winning position; the fastest ways to win were 54.h4 and 54.Bf5 according to the Shredder tablebase.

Alexander Beliavsky vs. Leif Erlend Johannessen

This example, from a game played in Linares in 2002, is one of the very rare circumstances where a grandmaster makes the worst move possible, the only one allowing checkmate on the next move. In this queen endgame, White has some advantage after 69.fxg6+ fxg6 70.Kf4 due to Black's weak pawn on c6. Beliavsky playing White played 69.Kf4??, however, overlooking the response 69...Qb8#. According to Johannessen, it took a few moments for both players to realize that it was checkmate, and Beliavsky was a good sport over this mishap.

Deep Fritz vs. Vladimir Kramnik

In November 2006, reigning world chess champion Vladimir Kramnik competed in the World Chess Challenge: Man vs. Machine, a six-game match against the chess computer Deep Fritz in Bonn, Germany. After the first game had ended in a draw, Kramnik, playing Black, was generally considered in a comfortable position in Game 2, and he thought so himself apparently, as he refused a draw by avoiding a potential threefold repetition on 29...Qa7. Kramnik's troubles began when he decided to play for a win and pushed his a-pawn, 31...a4. Commentators, including American grandmaster Yasser Seirawan, voiced concerns about Kramnik's intentions and the situation became more uncertain as the game went on with 32.Nxe6 Bxe3+ 33.Kh1 Bxc1 34.Nxf8, turning it into a likely draw. The game could have ended with 34...Kg8 35.Ng6 Bxb2 36.Qd5+ Kh7 37.Nf8+ Kh8 38.Ng6+.

However Kramnik's next move, 34...Qe3?? (a move awarded "???" originally by ChessBase on a story covering Kramnik's blunder, and even "??????" by Susan Polgar), came as a big surprise and was described as possibly the "blunder of the century" and perhaps the "biggest blunder ever" by Susan Polgar, as Kramnik overlooked a mate in one. Deep Fritz immediately ended the game with 35.Qh7, checkmate. Seirawan later called Kramnik's move "a tragedy".

From ChessBase: "Kramnik played the move 34...Qe3 calmly, stood up, picked up his cup and was about to leave the stage to go to his rest room. At least one audio commentator also noticed nothing, while Fritz operator Mathias Feist kept glancing from the board to the screen and back, hardly able to believe that he had input the correct move. Fritz was displaying mate in one, and when Mathias executed it on the board, Kramnik briefly grasped his forehead, took a seat to sign the score sheet and left for the press conference." During it, he stated that he had planned the supposedly winning move 34...Qe3 already when playing 29...Qa7, and had rechecked the line after each subsequent move. After an exchange of queens, Black would win easily with his distant pawn; after 35.Qxb4 Qe2 or 35.Ng6+ Kh7 36.Nf8+ Kg8 Black also wins eventually.

Chess journalist Alexander Roshal attempted to explain the blunder by saying that the mating pattern of a queen on h7 protected by a knight on f8 is extremely rare and not contained in a grandmaster's automatic repertoire.

Étienne Bacrot vs. Ernesto Inarkiev

This game was played in May 2008 at the Baku Grand Prix from the FIDE Grand Prix 2008–2010. In round 11, Étienne Bacrot played White against Ernesto Inarkiev. On move 23, he checked the black king with 23.Qe7+??. Both players calmly wrote down the move. Bacrot then realized that his queen was under attack by the black knight and resigned.

Magnus Carlsen vs. Levon Aronian

The game between the world's two highest-rated players in the 2012 Grand Slam Master's final in São Paulo and Bilbao (this game was played in São Paulo) featured a double blunder. Carlsen, with White, played the tactical blunder 27.Bf4??, and saw almost immediately that this loses to 27...R8xf4!, in effect winning a piece since taking the rook gives Black a forced mate: 28.gxf4 Nxf4 (threatening Qg2#) 29.Rg1 Qxh2+ 30.Kxh2 Rh3#.

Carlsen waited for Aronian to make his move, and Aronian eventually played the otherwise solid 27...Bc3??, allowing White back into the game. Aronian had seen 27...R8xf4, but playing quickly to avoid time trouble, he thought that White could strike back with 28.gxf4 Nxf4 29.Ra8+ since both 29...Kf7 and 29...Kh7 lose to the knight fork 30.Ng5+. He had missed, however, that the retreat 29...Bf8! ends White's brief counterattack and leaves White defenseless against the mate threat.

The game was eventually drawn by perpetual check on move 48.

Magnus Carlsen vs. Viswanathan Anand

The sixth game of the World Chess Championship 2014 in Sochi between Magnus Carlsen and Viswanathan Anand also featured a double blunder. Carlsen adopted the space-gaining Maróczy Bind setup against the Kan Variation of the Sicilian Defence, and accepted a set of isolated doubled pawns in return for active play. After an early queen exchange he soon developed a commanding position and appeared to have excellent winning chances. On his 26th move Carlsen played 26.Kd2??, immediately realizing after making the move that 26...Nxe5! (with a discovered attack on the g4-rook) 27.Rxg8 Nxc4+ (zwischenzug) 28.Kd3 Nb2+ 29.Ke2 Rxg8 leads to Black picking up two extra pawns and gaining excellent winning chances. Anand, not expecting the blunder, replied with 26...a4?? in less than a minute. He, too, saw the missed tactic immediately after making his move. Carlsen made no further mistakes and converted his advantage into a win.

Alireza Firouzja vs. Magnus Carlsen 

In this pawn ending (from a game in 2020), White is a pawn down, and to hold the draw, he either needs to preserve his last pawn, or (if Black decides to play ...Ke6 followed by ...f5) bring the king close enough to the e-file and stop the king from reaching any key squares. The correct move to draw is 69.Kd2!, when 69...Kc5 70.Kc3 prevents all king's entries onto the fourth rank, while 69...Ke6 70.Ke3 f5 71.exf5+ Kxf5 72.Kf3 prevents the king from advancing any further and reaching a key square. Instead, White blundered by giving up the opposition after 69.Kc3?? when after 69...Kc5 White resigned, as he loses his last pawn: 70.Kb3 Kd4 or 70.Kd3 Kb4 71.Ke3 Kc4 72.Kf3 Kd4 73.Kg3 Kxe4. Thus, the position after 69.Kc3?? Kc5 is reciprocal zugzwang: if Black were to move, it would be a draw, while if White to move, Black wins.

Ian Nepomniachtchi vs. Magnus Carlsen 

During the ninth game between Ian Nepomniachtchi and Magnus Carlsen in the World Chess Championship 2021, the game was equal until Nepomniachtchi played 27.c5??. This move handed the advantage to Carlsen since after 27...c6, the White bishop on b7 is trapped and the knight on b3 cannot move to c5 to defend it. The game followed with 28.f3 Nh6 29.Re4 Ra7 30.Rb4 Rb8 31.a4 Raxb7, leaving Carlsen a bishop up. Nepomniachtchi resigned eight moves later.

Nepomniachtchi had previously blundered in game 8 and would do so again in game 11, both times losing a pawn and giving Carlsen winning positions that he converted to win the match. Chess players and commentators widely believed that Nepomniachtchi's mental state was significantly impacted by the nearly 8-hour long game 6, and that the blunder in game 11 might have been him giving up on the match to get it over with.

Resignation in won positions
Sometimes players, including strong grandmasters, resign in a position in which they are actually winning, not losing. Chess historian Tim Krabbé calls this kind of mistake "the ultimate blunder".

Ignatz von Popiel vs. Georg Marco 

In this 1902 game between Ignatz von Popiel and Georg Marco, the black bishop on d4 is pinned to the rook on d7, and there are no additional friendly pieces to come to its defense. Seeing no way to save his bishop, Black resigned, missing 36...Bg1!, threatening ...Qxh2# and leaving no way for White to save both his queen and rook while staving off checkmate. Tim Krabbé called this the "earliest, most famous, and clearest example" of resigning with a winning position.

György Négyesy vs. Károly Honfi

In this game played in Budapest in 1955, Black saw that White's c3-knight is stopping ...Rd1#. Therefore, Black played 19...Qxa2+??, deflecting the knight. White agreed and resigned. Both players overlooked that after 20.Nxa2 Rd1+, the deflected knight can still stop the mate with 21.Nc1.

Raúl Sanguineti vs. Miguel Najdorf 

Black has a substantial material advantage, but due to Black's poor king safety, White has a forced win. Correct is 58.Qg8+ winning the bishop (since 58...Bf7 59.Qd8 leaves two mate threats which cannot be parried at the same time). Instead, White played 58.Kd8?? (threatening 59.Qe7#), thinking that it won on the spot. Miguel agreed, and resigned. Both players overlooked the defense 58...Rxg4, however, winning more material and allowing the black king to escape to f5. With the king on d8, White cannot play Qc8+, which would have won the rook.

Victor Korchnoi vs. Geert Van der Stricht 

Here, Black seems helpless against White's kingside threats. Agreeing with this idea, Black resigned – presumably seeing 36...Nxe5! 37.Rxe6 Nxd3 (threatening 38...Nf4+ and 38...fxe6) 38.Rxh6+ gxh6 39.Qxh6#. He missed, however, the fact that the White king was lined up with Black's rook, so 38...gxh6+ would have been check and 39.Qxh6# is illegal. After 39.Kf1 Rg6, Black defends his h6-pawn and has a decisive material advantage.

Complete game scores of the examples
Mikhail Chigorin vs. Wilhelm Steinitz, Havana 1892
Ernst Gruenfeld vs. Alexander Alekhine, Karlsbad 1923
Tigran Petrosian vs. David Bronstein, Amsterdam 1956
Miguel Najdorf vs. Bobby Fischer, 1966
Viktor Korchnoi vs. Anatoly Karpov, 1978
Murray Chandler vs. Susan Polgar, Biel 1987
Alexander Beliavsky vs. Leif Erlend Johannessen, Linares 2002
Deep Fritz vs. Vladimir Kramnik, Bonn 2006 (chessbase.com)
Étienne Bacrot vs. Ernesto Inarkiev, 2008
Magnus Carlsen vs. Levon Aronian, 2012
Magnus Carlsen vs. Viswanathan Anand, 2014
Alireza Firouzja vs. Magnus Carlsen, 2020
Ian Nepomniachtchi vs. Magnus Carlsen, Dubai 2021
Ignatz von Popiel vs. Georg Marco, 1902
Gyorgy Negyesi vs. Karoly Honfi, Budapest 1955
Raul Sanguineti vs. Miguel Najdorf, Mar del Plata 1956
Viktor Korchnoi vs. Geert van der Stricht, Plovdiv 2003

See also
 Back-rank checkmate
 Choke (sports)
 Kotov syndrome
 Swindle (chess)

References

Chess terminology